In numerical analysis, Broyden's method is a quasi-Newton method for finding roots in  variables. It was originally described by C. G. Broyden in 1965.

Newton's method for solving  uses the Jacobian matrix, at every iteration. However, computing this Jacobian is a difficult and expensive operation. The idea behind Broyden's method is to compute the whole Jacobian only at the first iteration and to do rank-one updates at other iterations.

In 1979 Gay proved that when Broyden's method is applied to a linear system of size , it
terminates in  steps, although like all quasi-Newton methods, it may not converge for nonlinear systems.

Description of the method

Solving single-variable equation 

and proceed similar to Newton's method:

where  is the iteration index.

Solving a system of nonlinear equations 

Consider a system of  nonlinear equations

where  is a vector-valued function of vector :

For such problems, Broyden gives a generalization of the one-dimensional Newton's method, replacing the derivative with the Jacobian . The Jacobian matrix is determined iteratively, based on the secant equation in the finite-difference approximation:

where  is the iteration index.  For clarity, let us define:

so the above may be rewritten as

The above equation is underdetermined when  is greater than one. Broyden suggests using the current estimate of the Jacobian matrix  and improving upon it by taking the solution to the secant equation that is a minimal modification to :

This minimizes the following Frobenius norm:

We may then proceed in the Newton direction:

Broyden also suggested using the Sherman–Morrison formula to update directly the inverse of the Jacobian matrix:

This first method is commonly known as the "good Broyden's method".

This yields a second method, the so-called "bad Broyden's method" (but see):

This minimizes a different Frobenius norm:

Many other quasi-Newton schemes have been suggested in optimization, where one seeks a maximum or minimum by finding the root of the first derivative (gradient in multiple dimensions). The Jacobian of the gradient is called Hessian and is symmetric, adding further constraints to its update.

Other members of the Broyden class 
Broyden has defined not only two methods, but a whole class of methods. Other members of this class have been added by other authors.
 The Davidon–Fletcher–Powell update is the only member of this class being published before the two members defined by Broyden.
 Schubert's or sparse Broyden algorithm – a modification for sparse Jacobian matrices.
 Klement (2014) – uses fewer iterations to solve many equation systems.

See also 
 Secant method
 Newton's method
 Quasi-Newton method
 Newton's method in optimization
 Davidon–Fletcher–Powell formula
 Broyden–Fletcher–Goldfarb–Shanno (BFGS) method

References

Further reading

External links 
 Simple basic explanation: The story of the blind archer

Quasi-Newton methods